The 1972 United States presidential election in North Dakota took place on November 7, 1972, as part of the 1972 United States presidential election. Voters chose three representatives, or electors, to the Electoral College, who voted for president and vice president.

North Dakota was won by incumbent President Richard Nixon (R–California), with 62.07 percent of the popular vote, against George McGovern (D–South Dakota), with 35.79 percent of the popular vote, a 26.28 percent margin of victory. Three other candidates were on the ballot as independents, but only California Congressman John G. Schmitz received a significant vote tally, although even Schmitz received just 2.01 percent of North Dakota's total.

In a state that would reflect McGovern's national results, the Democratic nominee only won one county (Rolette) in North Dakota.

Results

Results by county

See also
 United States presidential elections in North Dakota

References

North Dakota
1972
1972 North Dakota elections